Cevizli is a village in the Sason District, Batman Province, Turkey. The village is populated by Kurds of the Timok tribe and had a population of 242 in 2021.

The hamlets of Gölbaşı, Hasanbey and Kayadibi are attached to the village.

References

Villages in Sason District

Kurdish settlements in Batman Province